These are the official results of the Women's Discus Throw event at the 1991 IAAF World Championships in Tokyo, Japan. There were a total of 31 participating athletes, with two qualifying groups and the final held on Saturday August 31, 1991.

Medalists

Schedule
All times are Japan Standard Time (UTC+9)

Abbreviations
All results shown are in metres

Qualifying round
Held on Thursday 1991-08-29

Final

See also
 1988 Women's Olympic Discus Throw (Seoul)
 1990 Women's European Championships Discus Throw (Split)
 1992 Women's Olympic Discus Throw (Barcelona)
 1994 Women's European Championships Discus Throw (Helsinki)

References
 Results
 IAAF

D
Discus throw at the World Athletics Championships
1991 in women's athletics